The SFCA Lignel 31 was a French, single engine, low wing monoplane, one of a series of this type built by SFCA in the 1930s. It was  capable of aerobatics but was primarily a racing aircraft.

Specifications

References

SFCA aircraft
1930s French sport aircraft
Single-engined tractor aircraft
Low-wing aircraft
Aircraft first flown in 1939